Rinoie Motohiro（李家元宥, 1589-1647）was a samurai from Joseon who served the Mōri clan and retainer of Chōshū Domain in the early Edo period. He was the son of Korean commander and politician Yi Bok-nam.

Life 
In 1589, Rinoie was born in Joseon as Yi Gyeong-bu. When he was a child, the Imjin war occurred. In 1597, his father was killed in the Siege of Namwon. He was captured by Asonuma Motonobu, the retainer of Mōri and brought to Japan. He brought his military equipment with the Chinese letter 李家龍虎 (Dragon and Tiger of Yi clan) engraved on it.

He learned the Japanese language in Japan. He was summoned by Mōri Terumoto and given the territory of 100 koku in Katsuma, Kumage District. He also became the otogishū (adviser) of the Mōri clan.

He became a Buddhist priest and took the name Motohiro using the character 元 (moto) given by Terumoto from his own name. His surname Rinoie (李家) means ”house of Yi" in Japanese.

Rinoie learned kenjutsu from Ōno Ienobu a.k.a. Yagyū Ienobu, one of the finest disciples of Yagyū Muneyoshi. He was left with Uchidachi by Ienobu and given the menkyo of Yagyū Shinkage-ryū. Furthermore, at Ienobu's death, Rinoie was given his own Yari and katana.

Rinoie died in 1647 at the age of 59.

See also 
Yagyū Shume - Korean samurai who served Yagyū clan

References 
 『閥閲録|萩藩閥閲録』巻141「李家宗億」（山口県文書館編、『萩藩閥閲録』、1987年、4巻、141-142頁所収）
 Okabe Tadao『萩藩諸家系譜』（マツノ書店、1999年復刻）1209-1212頁

Samurai
16th-century Korean people
People of the Japanese invasions of Korea (1592–1598)
Foreign samurai in Japan
1589 births
1647 deaths
17th-century Japanese people
Zainichi Korean people
People from Seoul